"All You Have to Do" is a single by American female pop group Boy Krazy, written and produced by Mike Stock and Pete Waterman. Lead vocals were performed by group member Johnna Cummings, with additional lead vocals in the chorus by Josselyne Jones.

Released in February 1992, this was Boy Krazy's first single as a quartet, after Renee Veneziale left the band in 1991. The song was not a hit for the group, only peaking at #91 in the UK singles chart. The fact that this single was only released on vinyl and not as a CD single may have hindered a bigger success, as the British public were switching to a CD format at the time. The song was later included on the group's debut album in 1993.

The B-side to this single was "Good Times with Bad Boys" which was released as a single on its own in 1993.

In August 2009, the single was released through iTunes as a digital EP, including never released remixes of the song and other album tracks.

Charts

Formats and track listings 

7" Single
All You Have To Do 
Good Times With Bad Boys

12" Single
All You Have To Do (12" Version)
Good Times With Bad Boys
All You Have To Do (Instrumental)

iTunes EP
All You Have To Do
All You Have To Do (Extended Version)
All You Have To Do (Instrumental)
All You Have To Do (Backing Track) *
Don't Wanna Let You Go *
Don't Wanna Let You Go (Instrumental) *
Who Could Ask For Anything More? (Original Version) *
Who Could Ask For Anything More? (Original Instrumental) *
Who Could Ask For Anything More? (Original Backing Track) *
Who Could Ask For Anything More? (Album Instrumental) *
Who Could Ask For Anything More? (Album Backing Track) *

1992 singles
Songs written by Pete Waterman
Songs written by Mike Stock (musician)
1992 songs
PolyGram singles
Next Plateau Entertainment singles